Pimlott is a surname. Notable people with the surname include:

Arthur Pimlott (died 1895), English footballer
Ben Pimlott (1945–2004), British historian
John Pimlott (footballer), English footballer
John Pimlott (historian), British military historian
Steven Pimlott (1953–2007), English opera and theatre director

Fictional characters
Charlie Pimlott, a character in the British soap opera Coronation Street